Dahrendorf is a German surname. Notable people with the surname include:

Ellen Dahrendorf, British historian and translator
Gustav Dahrendorf (1901–1954), German politician
Nicola Dahrendorf, British government and United Nations official
Ralf Dahrendorf (1929–2009), German-British sociologist, philosopher, political scientist and politician

See also
Dahrendorf hypothesis, name given to a hypothesis by the German-British political scientist Ralf Dahrendorf, which states that diversity is desirable in economic policies across time and space according to local needs

German-language surnames